The following is a timeline of the history of the city of Dresden, Saxony, Germany.

Prior to 18th century

 1206 – first documentation of Dresden.
 1215 – Nikolaikirche founded.
 1272 – Franziskanerkloster founded.
 1309 – City seal incorporates coat of arms of Dresden.
 1350 – first documentation of Altendresden (today Innere Neustadt) at the northern side of the Elbe.
 1351 – Sophienkirche built.
 1388 – Kreuzkirche consecrated.
 1400 – Busmannkapelle built.
 1409 – Armory established.
 1434 – Striezelmarkt occurring.
 1524 - Printing press in operation.
 1530 – City expands.
 1548 – Orchestra founded.
 1563 –  built.
 1589 – Johanneum built.
 1666 – Premiere of Schütz's St Matthew Passion.
 1667 – Opera house opens.
 1678 - "Elector of Saxony's Players" dramatic troupe(de) headquartered in Dresden (approximate date).
 1695 – Parade of Frederick Augustus I.
 1697 – Population: 40,000 (approximate).
 1700 – Von Tschirnhaus glassworks set up.

18th century

 1704 - Palais Flemming-Sulkowski built.
 1708 – Porcelain developed by Johann Friedrich Böttger.
 1710 – Meissen porcelain manufactory begins operating near city.
 1717 – Japanisches Palais built.
 1718 – Royal Palace rebuilt.
 1719 – Wedding reception of Polish Prince Frederick Augustus and Maria Josepha of Austria.
 1720 – Catholic Cemetery opens by decree of King Augustus II the Strong.
 1722
 Zwinger built.
 Picture Gallery founded.
 1723
 Grünes Gewölbe founded.
 Pillnitz Castle built.
 1724 – Royal Cabinet of Mathematical and Physical Instruments established.
 1729 – Wackerbarth-Palais built.
 1736 – Equestrian sculpture of Polish King August the Strong unveiled.
 1743 – Frauenkirche built.
 1745 - City "taken by the Russians."
 1748 – Collegium Medico Chirurgicum established.
 1755 – Population: 63,000 (approximate).
 1756 – Catholic Church of the Royal Court built.
 1759 - September: "Dresden liberated from Prussians."
 1760 – July: Siege of Dresden.
 1763 – Death and burial of King Augustus III of Poland at the Catholic Church of the Royal Court.
 1764 – Dresden Art Academy founded.
 1776 – Landhaus built.
 1784 – Observatory established.
 1788 – Saxon Library opens.
 1793 – Tadeusz Kościuszko begins preparations for the Kościuszko Uprising in the city in response to the Second Partition of Poland.

19th century

 1807 – Constitution of the Duchy of Warsaw promulgated.
 1809 – Austrians in power.
 1813 – 26–27 August: Battle of Dresden.
 1814 – Großer Garten opens to the public.
 1818 – Ernst Arnold gallery established.
 1823 – Jordan & Timaeus chocolate manufactury established.
 1828 – Saxon Technical School founded.
 1833 – Isis Society (natural history) founded.
 1838 - Dresden Coinage Convention held in city.
 1839 – Leipzig–Dresden railway begins operating.
 1843 - Jam factory begins operating.
 1845 – Flood.
 1841 – Opera house built.
 1845 - 19 October: Premiere of Wagner's opera Tannhäuser.
 1849 – May Uprising in Dresden.
 1852
 Marien Brucke (bridge) constructed.
 Population: 100,000.
 1854 – Semper Gallery and Schloss Albrechtsberg built.
 1855 – September: Royal Gallery opens.
 1856 – Dresden Conservatory established.
 1858 - Population: 128,152.
 1861 – Dresden Zoo opens.
 1866 – Prussians in power.
 1870 – Gewerbehausorchester founded.
 1871 – Military facility built in Albertstadt.
 1874 - Dresden English Football Club confirmed
 1875 – Dresden Museum of Ethnology founded.
 1876 – Fürstenzug created.
 1878 – Opera house rebuilt.
 1889
 Albertinum built.
 Dresden Botanical Garden created.
 1891 – Dresden City Museum founded.
 1893 – Blue Wonder bridge constructed.
 1895 – Dresden Funicular Railway begins operating.
 1897 – Dresden Central Station built.
 1898
  camera factory in operation.
 Dresdner SC football club formed.

20th century

1900-1945

 1901
 Dresden-Neustadt station opens.
 Schwebebahn Dresden begins operating.
 1903 
 German City Exhibit held.
 Simmel delivers The Metropolis and Mental Life lecture.
 1904 – Ministry building constructed.
 1905 - 9 December: Premiere of Strauss' opera Salome.
 1910
  (city library) formed.
 Augustus Bridge constructed.
 1911
 Dresden Museums Association formed.
 Premiere of Strauss' opera Der Rosenkavalier.
 1912 – Ihagee camera company and German Hygiene Museum founded.
 1914 – Saxon army museum established.
 1919
 Stadion am Ostragehege des Dresdner SC opens.
 Population: 529,326.
 1923 – Glücksgas Stadium built.
 1933 – Population: 649,252.
 1935 – Dresden-Klotzsche Airport opens.

 1939
 September: Mass arrests of local Polish activists (see also Nazi crimes against the Polish nation).
 Population: 625,174.
 1940 – Hans Nieland becomes mayor.
 1942 – Subcamp of the Flossenbürg concentration camp founded at the SS Engineer's Barracks.
 1944
 15 September: Subcamp of the Flossenbürg concentration camp founded at the Railway Repair Works. Its prisoners were mostly Poles and Russians.
 9 October: Two women subcamps of Flossenbürg founded at the Goehle-Werk and Universelle factories. Its prisoners were mostly Poles, Russians and Germans.
 22 October: Dresden-Reick subcamp of Flossenbürg founded. Its prisoners were mostly Polish, Russian and Jewish women.
 24 November: Dresden-Bernsdorf subcamp of Flossenbürg founded. Its prisoners were mostly Polish-Jewish men, women and children.
 1945
 13–14 February: Aerial bombing by Allied forces.
 19 February: Subcamp of Flossenbürg at the Railway Repair Works dissolved. Prisoners deported to the main Flossenbürg camp.
 24 March: Dresden-Reichsbahn subcamp of Flossenbürg founded. Its prisoners were mostly Polish, Jewish and Russian men.
 April: Goehle-Werk, Bernsdorf, Reichsbahn, Universelle and SS Engineer's Barracks subcamps of Flossenbürg dissolved. Prisoners either deported or mostly sent on death marches to various other locations.
 22–27 April: Battle of Dresden
 April: Reick subcamp of Flossenbürg dissolved. Prisoners sent on a death march to the Ore Mountains.
 8 May: Russians take city.

1946-1990s
 1946
 Sächsische Zeitung begins publication.
 Population: 450,000.
 1950
 SG Deutsche Volkspolizei Dresden football club founded.
 Botanical Garden restored.
 Hellerau and Pillnitz incorporated into city.
 1956 – Dresden Transport Museum opens.
 1959 – Galerie Neue Meister formed.
 1960 – Józef Ignacy Kraszewski Museum opens at his former house.
 1961 – Dresden University of Technology formed.
 1972 –  opens.
 1973 – Dresden S-Bahn established.
 1983
 Staatsschauspiel Dresden formed.
 Population: 522,532.
 1986 - Pinova apple created.
 1989
 protests stop the planned high-purity silicon factory
 trains with East German embassy refugees from Prague pass Dresden main station with demonstrations and clashes with the police
 Monday demonstrations
 1990 - Dresdner Neueste Nachrichten begins publication.
 1991
 Bunte Republik Neustadt festival begins.
 Fußballverein Dresden-Nord formed.
 1992
 Soviet forces withdrawn.
 Helmholtz-Zentrum Dresden-Rossendorf established.
 1996 –  founded.
 2000 -  (city archives) relocated to Elisabeth-Boer-Strasse.

21st century

 2002
 Elbe Flood.
 Volkswagen's Transparent Factory opens.
 2004
 Dresden High Magnetic Field Laboratory established.
 Dresden Elbe Valley designated an UNESCO World Heritage Site.
 2005
 Dresden Frauenkirche rebuilt.
 Dresden City Art Gallery opens.
 Neo-Nazi demonstration.
 2006 – 800th anniversary of founding of Dresden.
 2007
 Freiberger Arena opens.
 Waldschlösschen Bridge construction begins.
 2008
 Helma Orosz becomes mayor.
 December: City hosts the 38th Chess Olympiad.
 2009 - Dresden Elbe Valley's UNESCO World Heritage Site status is revoked.
 2010 – Anti-fascist demonstration.
 2011
 Bundeswehr Military History Museum opens.
 Population: 523,058.
 2013
 Elbe flood.
 September: City co-hosts the 2013 Women's European Volleyball Championship.
 2014 - PEGIDA begin protesting(de) against Islamism in the city, drawing crowds estimated up to 17,000 in peak
 2015 - Dirk Hilbert becomes mayor.

See also
 
 Economy of Dresden
 

Other cities in the state of Saxony:
 Timeline of Chemnitz
 Timeline of Leipzig

References

This article incorporates information from the German Wikipedia.

Bibliography

in English
 
 
 
 
 
 
 
 
 
 
 
 
 
  (fulltext)

in German
  circa 1650/1690

External links

 Links to fulltext city directories for Dresden via Wikisource
 Europeana. Items related to Dresden, various dates.

Years in Germany

Dresden
Dresden
Dresden